Sohrab Entezari (born April 21, 1977) is a retired Iranian footballer.

Club career statistics
Last update: May 21, 2011

External links
Persian League Profile

1977 births
Living people
People from Babol
Iranian footballers
Persian Gulf Pro League players
Persepolis F.C. players
Shahrdari Tabriz players
Rah Ahan players
Shamoushak Noshahr players
Association football forwards
Sportspeople from Mazandaran province